The 2021 Chicago Fall Tennis Classic was a WTA tournament organised for female professional tennis players on outdoor hard courts due to the cancellation of the Asian tournaments because of the ongoing COVID-19 pandemic. It was the 1st edition of the event and took place at XS Tennis and Education Foundation in Chicago, United States from 27 September to 3 October 2021.

Champions

Singles

  Garbiñe Muguruza def.  Ons Jabeur, 3–6, 6–3, 6–0

Doubles

  Květa Peschke /  Andrea Petkovic def.  Caroline Dolehide /  CoCo Vandeweghe, 6–3, 6–1

Singles main draw entrants

Seeds

 Rankings are as of September 20, 2021.

Other entrants
The following players received wildcards into the singles main draw:
  Hailey Baptiste
  Kim Clijsters
  Caroline Dolehide 
  CoCo Vandeweghe

The following players received entry from the qualifying draw:
  Lizette Cabrera 
  Kirsten Flipkens
  Magdalena Fręch 
  Beatriz Haddad Maia 
  Mai Hontama
  Maddison Inglis
  Anna Kalinskaya
  Kateryna Kozlova

The following players received entry as lucky losers:
  Harriet Dart
  Olga Govortsova

Withdrawals
Before the tournament
  Sorana Cîrstea → replaced by  Hsieh Su-wei
  Coco Gauff → replaced by  Ann Li
  Daria Kasatkina → replaced by  Amanda Anisimova
  Sofia Kenin → replaced by  Andrea Petkovic
  Johanna Konta → replaced by  Madison Brengle
  Petra Kvitová → replaced by  Misaki Doi
  Petra Martić → replaced by  María Camila Osorio Serrano
  Jeļena Ostapenko → replaced by  Harriet Dart
  Karolína Plíšková → replaced by  Kaia Kanepi
  Alison Riske → replaced by  Jasmine Paolini
  Aryna Sabalenka → replaced by  Sloane Stephens
  Maria Sakkari → replaced by  Olga Govortsova
  Elena Vesnina → replaced by  Marie Bouzková

During the tournament
  Victoria Azarenka
  Anett Kontaveit
  Markéta Vondroušová

Doubles main draw entrants

Seeds 

 1 Rankings as of September 20, 2021.

Other entrants 
The following pairs received wildcards into the doubles main draw:
  Hailey Baptiste /  Whitney Osuigwe 
  Kim Clijsters /  Kirsten Flipkens
  Caroline Dolehide /  CoCo Vandeweghe 

The following pair received entry into the doubles main draw using a protected ranking:
  Ingrid Neel /  Anastasia Rodionova

Withdrawals
Before the tournament
  Lyudmyla Kichenok /  Jeļena Ostapenko → replaced by  Magdalena Fręch /  Katarzyna Kawa
  Marta Kostyuk /  Dayana Yastremska → replaced by  Lyudmyla Kichenok /  Marta Kostyuk
  Jamie Loeb /  Tereza Mihalíková → replaced by  Harriet Dart /  Tereza Mihalíková

References

External links
Tournament profile
Official website

Chicago Fall Tennis Classic
Chicago Fall Tennis Classic
Chicago Fall Tennis Classic
Chicago Fall Tennis Classic
Chicago Fall Tennis Classic